Mühlental is a municipality in the Vogtlandkreis district, in Saxony, Germany. It consists of the villages Hermsgrün, Wohlbach, Saalig, Marieney, Unterwürschnitz, Oberwürschnitz, Elstertal, Tirschendorf, Willitzgrün and Zaulsdorf.

References 

Vogtlandkreis